Fred Krupp has been the president of Environmental Defense Fund, a U.S.-based nonprofit environmental advocacy group since 1984. Considered a key architect of the Kyoto Protocol and someone who has worked towards convincing corporations of environmentalism, he received the 2015 William K. Reilly Environmental Leadership Award.

Early life and education 

Krupp grew up in Verona, New Jersey, and became acquainted with recycling through his father's company, which used old rags to create roofing material. He is a graduate of Yale University with a law degree from the University of Michigan and has taught environmental law at both schools.

Career

Early career 
Prior to joining Environmental Defense Fund, Krupp spent several years in private law practice in New Haven, Connecticut, at several firms: Cooper, Whitney, Cochran & Krupp (1984); partner, Albis & Krupp (1978–1984). During that time he also was founder and general counsel for the Connecticut Fund for the Environment (1978–1984), a leading state environmental group.

Environmental Defense Fund 
Since 1984, when he became president of Environmental Defense Fund, he has been influential in developing many innovative market-based solutions, including the acid rain reduction plan in the 1990 Clean Air Act, and the U.S. proposal to achieve least-cost greenhouse gas reductions in the Kyoto Protocol. According to the Form 990 filed by Environmental Defense Fund with the Internal Revenue Service as required by law, in 2004 he earned $357,057 in salary and $51,113 in other compensation as president. According to the Form 990 filed by Environmental Defense Fund with the Internal Revenue Service as required by law, in 2016 he earned $650,951 in salary and $61,865 in other compensation as president

He has been described as the environmentalist who "has been the most successful in persuading the corporate world—and those who support its interests—to embrace the green cause". Examples including convincing McDonald's to forgo styrofoam for paper, Wal-Mart to stock energy-efficient light bulbs, and Duke Energy to invest in wind power.

Other activities 
Krupp serves on the board of the H. John Heinz III Center for Science, Economics and the Environment, the John F. Kennedy School of Government Environment Council, the Nicholas Institute for Environmental Policy Solutions, and the Leadership Council of the Yale School of Forestry and Environmental Studies. He has served on the President's Advisory Committee on Trade Policy and Negotiations for Presidents Bill Clinton and George W. Bush.

He is the recipient of the 1999 Keystone Leadership in Environment Award, and the 2002 Champion Award from the Women's Council on Energy and the Environment.

In March 2008, he wrote Earth: The Sequel with journalist Miriam Horn, highlighting technology that aims to fight global warming.

He was elected by fellow alumni to serve as an alumni fellow of Yale's Board of Trustees for a six-year term beginning on July 1, 2022.

Personal life 
He lives in Connecticut with his wife, Laurie, and their three children.

As an avid rower, he won a gold medal in the 2006 World Rowing Masters Regatta sponsored by the World Rowing Federation.

References

External links
 "The Making of a Market-Minded Environmentalist", autobiographical article by Fred Krupp in Strategy+Business (registration required)

American environmentalists
Year of birth missing (living people)
Living people
Yale University alumni
University of Michigan Law School alumni
Connecticut lawyers
People from Verona, New Jersey